Branislav Mitrović (born 30 January 1985) is a Serbian water polo goalkeeper for Vasas and the Serbia men's national water polo team. He won the European title in 2012, 2014, 2016 and 2018, the world title in 2015, and Olympic gold medals in 2016 and 2020. He was named the Best Goalkeeper at the 2015 World Championships. and Olympic Games 2020.

National career
On 29 January 2012, Mitrović won the European Championship with his national team beating in the final Montenegro by 9:8. This was his first gold medal with the national team.

Personal life
Mitrović became a goalkeeper after an advice from his first coach to make use of his large frame and long hands in the goal. He is married to Jelena.

See also
 Serbia men's Olympic water polo team records and statistics
 List of Olympic champions in men's water polo
 List of Olympic medalists in water polo (men)
 List of men's Olympic water polo tournament goalkeepers
 List of world champions in men's water polo
 List of World Aquatics Championships medalists in water polo

References

External links

 
 

1985 births
Living people
Sportspeople from Novi Sad
Serbian male water polo players
Water polo goalkeepers
Water polo players at the 2016 Summer Olympics
Water polo players at the 2020 Summer Olympics
Medalists at the 2016 Summer Olympics
Medalists at the 2020 Summer Olympics
Olympic gold medalists for Serbia in water polo
World Aquatics Championships medalists in water polo
European champions for Serbia
Competitors at the 2005 Mediterranean Games
Mediterranean Games medalists in water polo
Mediterranean Games bronze medalists for Serbia
Universiade medalists in water polo
Universiade gold medalists for Serbia
Universiade bronze medalists for Serbia
Serbian expatriate sportspeople in Hungary
Medalists at the 2011 Summer Universiade